Kirlyay is a village in Kovylkinsky District of the Republic of Mordovia, Russia.

Rural localities in Mordovia
Kovylkinsky District